Nyrika Holkar is an Indian businessperson, philanthropist, and a fourth-generation member of the Godrej family.

Early life and education

Nyrika Holkar is a member of the Godrej family. She is the daughter of Smita and Vijay Crishna and niece of Jamshyd Godrej, Chairman and Managing Director of Godrej & Boyce.  Nyrika graduated from Colorado College and studied law the University College London.

She is a member of the Bar Association of India and is a qualified solicitor in the UK.

Career

Nyrika started her career as a solicitor AZB & Partners, a legal firm. She advised companies on investing in India and specialised in M&A at the firm. Thereafter, she was appointed to the Board of Directors, Godrej & Boyce in 2017. In 2022, it was announced that Nyrika would succeed Jamsyd Godrej at Godrej & Boyce, though no timeline has been set for the transition so far.

As Executive Director, she is in charge of digital strategy, brand management, legal matters and mergers & acquisitions at the company.

Philanthropy

She is a member on the Board of the Centre for Advancement of Philanthropy and the United World Colleges India. Nyrika is a patron of Child Relief and You.

Personal life

Nyrika is married to Yeshwant Holkar. She is a yoga practitioner, and is a runner. She likes reading, hiking and photography.

References

Indian women business executives
Indian business executives
Living people
Parsi people from Mumbai
Godrej family
Businesspeople from Mumbai
Alumni of University College London
1982 births